The Noto VLBI Station is a radio observatory located on Sicily, southern Italy, outside the city of Noto. The facility is operated by the Istituto di Radioastronomia di Bologna.

The antenna is a 32-metre diameter paraboloid fitted with an active surface and receivers for astronomy observations from 1 to 86 GHz. The Noto antenna is used in conjunction with other antennas throughout Europe and the world for VLBI.

See also
Istituto di Radioastronomia di Bologna
List of radio telescopes
Medicina Radio Observatory
EVN

References

Radio telescopes
Astronomical observatories in Italy
Buildings and structures in Noto